Air Chief Marshal Sir David Cousins,  (born 20 January 1942) is a British retired senior Royal Air Force (RAF) commander.

Early life and education
Cousins was born in 1942, the son of Peter and Irene Cousins. He was educated at St. Edward's College, Malta, Prince Rupert School in Wilhelmshaven, Germany, after which he attended the Royal Air Force College and Open University.

RAF career
Cousins joined the RAF in 1961 and spent three years at Royal Air Force College Cranwell. He then had a number of operational flying tours, initially flying Lightnings in the air defence role in the UK and with RAF Germany and then Buccaneers for RAF Germany. In 1983 he became Station Commander at RAF Laarbruch, home to four RAF Squadrons flying Jaguars and Tornados.

He then held a number of staff appointments in air plans, operational requirements and operations. Following attendance at the Royal College of Defence Studies, he held a number of senior air rank positions on the Air Staff at the Ministry of Defence, in the MoD Procurement Executive, as Commandant of the Royal Air Force College Cranwell and, from 1994, as Air Officer Commanding No. 38 (Transport) Group. He was appointed Air Member for Personnel on the Air Force Board and Air Officer Commanding-in-Chief Personnel and Training Command in May 1995 and served in that role until he retired in August 1998.

Cousins has served as Honorary Air Commodore of No. 7630 (Volunteer Reserve) Intelligence Squadron, Royal Auxiliary Air Force since August 2008: the unit provides support for intelligence analysis and briefings. He has also served as the controller of the RAF Benevolent Fund.

Family
In 1966, he married Mary Cousins, daughter of Rev. A. W. S. Holmes. They have two sons and a daughter. He has 7 grandchildren.

References

|-

|-

|-

Royal Air Force air marshals
Living people
Knights Commander of the Order of the Bath
Recipients of the Air Force Cross (United Kingdom)
Graduates of the Royal Air Force College Cranwell
Honorary air commodores
Commandants of the Royal Air Force College Cranwell
1942 births